Olga Appell Avalos (born August 2, 1963, in Durango) is an American long-distance runner from Mexico, best known for winning the gold medal in the women's marathon at the 1991 Pan American Games in Havana, Cuba. She ran at the 1992 Summer Olympics the following year, but failed to finish the race. She competed for Mexico until February 25, 1994, at which point she switched allegiance to the United States. She represented her adopted country at the 1996 Summer Olympics. There she was eliminated in the qualifying heats of the women's 10,000 metres event.

She won the USA Cross Country Championships in 1994. Among her wins on the road running circuit were the 1993 Sapporo Half Marathon, 1994 Lilac Bloomsday Run and 1995 Vancouver Sun Run. She won the Hokkaido Marathon on two occasions, 1992 and 1995 (the second time as a naturalized U.S. citizen) and was the 1996 winner of the Twin Cities Marathon. Olga Appell is the 12th best marathoner in USA History.

References

External links

1963 births
Living people
Sportspeople from Durango
People from Durango City
American female long-distance runners
American female cross country runners
Mexican female long-distance runners
Mexican female cross country runners
American sportspeople of Mexican descent
Mexican emigrants to the United States
Olympic athletes of Mexico
Olympic track and field athletes of the United States
Athletes (track and field) at the 1992 Summer Olympics
Athletes (track and field) at the 1996 Summer Olympics
Pan American Games track and field athletes for the United States
Pan American Games gold medalists for Mexico
Pan American Games medalists in athletics (track and field)
Athletes (track and field) at the 1991 Pan American Games
World Athletics Championships athletes for Mexico
Medalists at the 1991 Pan American Games
21st-century American women